Dutch Buffalo Creek is a  long 4th order tributary to the Rocky River in Cabarrus County, North Carolina.  This is the only stream of this name in the United States.

Variant names
According to the Geographic Names Information System, it has also been known historically as:
Dutch Buffaloe Creek

Course
Dutch Buffalo Creek rises in Bostian Heights, North Carolina in Rowan County, and then flows southeast into Cabarrus County and then turns south-southwest to join the Rocky River about 0.25 miles southwest of Georgeville.

Watershed
Dutch Buffalo Creek drains  of area, receives about 47.1 in/year of precipitation, has a wetness index of 416.58, and is about 48% forested.

References

Rivers of North Carolina
Rivers of Cabarrus County, North Carolina
Rivers of Rowan County, North Carolina